Sergio Peña may refer to:
 Sergio Peña (Peruvian footballer) (born 1995), Peruvian footballer for C.D. Tondela on loan from Granada CF
 Sergio Peña (Honduran footballer) (born 1987), Honduran footballer for F.C. Motagua
 Sergio Peña (racing driver) (born 1993), American NASCAR driver
 Sergio Peña Clos (1927–2018), Puerto Rican politician